was a JR East railway station located in the city of Kesennuma, Miyagi Prefecture, Japan. The station was damaged by the 2011 Tōhoku earthquake and tsunami; however services have now been replaced by a provisional bus rapid transit line.

Lines
Rikuzen-Hashikami Station was served by the Kesennuma Line, and was located 61.6 rail kilometers from the terminus of the line at Maeyachi Station.

Station layout
Rikuzen-Hashikami Station had a single island platform connected to the station building by an overhead crossing. The station was unattended.

History
Rikuzen-Hashikami Station opened on 11 February 1957. The station was absorbed into the JR East network upon the privatization of the Japan National Railways (JNR) on April 1, 1987. Rail services were suspended after the 2011 Tōhoku earthquake and tsunami and have now been replaced by a bus rapid transit line.

Surrounding area
Japan National Route 45
 Iwai Peninsula
 Ise Beach Ocean Bathing Area

External links

  
  video of a train trip from Minami-Kesennuma Station to Rikuzen-Hashikami Station in 2009, passing through Matsuiwa Station and Saichi Station without stopping at around 03:05 minutes and 05:05 minutes, respectively.  Satellite photos (e.g., in Google Maps) showed that large sections of track and railway bridges were severely affected or washed away by the 2011 tsunami.  Minami-Kesennuma Station, Matsuiwa Station and Saichi Station were all badly damaged or destroyed.
  video of a train trip from Rikuzen-Hashikami Station to Motoyoshi Station in 2009, passing through Ōya-Kaigan Station and Koganezawa Station without stopping at around 03:25 minutes and 06:30 minutes, respectively.  Satellite photos (e.g., in Google Maps) showed that large sections of track and railway bridges were severely affected or washed away by the 2011 tsunami.  Rikuzen-Hashikami Station was undamaged, Ōya-Kaigan Station was badly damaged or destroyed, and Koganezawa Station was damaged.

Railway stations in Miyagi Prefecture
Kesennuma Line
Railway stations in Japan opened in 1957
Railway stations closed in 2011
Kesennuma